The National Kaohsiung University of Hospitality and Tourism (NKUHT) is a public university located in Siaogang District, Kaohsiung, Taiwan.  It is the only public university specializing in hospitality and tourism in Taiwan.

The total amount of Bachelor, Master and Doctoral enrollments were 5,331 in 2016.

Rankings 
According to 2021 ARWU Subject Ranking, the NKUHT ranked 151-200 in the world and No.6 in Taiwan, which is next to National Dong Hwa University (101-150 Globally).

History
The university was originally established as National Kaohsiung Hospitality Management Academy on 1 July 1995.

On 1 August 2000, it was upgraded to National Kaohsiung Hospitality College（NKHC）.

On 1 August 2010, it was upgraded to National Kaohsiung University of Hospitality and Tourism.

Faculties
 School of Culinary Arts
Graduate Institute of Food Culture and Innovation
Department of Chinese Culinary Arts
Department of Western Culinary Arts
Department of Baking Technology and Management
Department of Culinary Arts
 School of Hospitality Management
Graduate Institute of Hospitality
Department of Hotel Management
Department of Food and Beverage Management
Department of Hospitality and M.I.C.E. Marketing Management
 School of Tourism
Graduate Institute of Tourism Management
Department of Travel Management
Department of Airline and Transport Service Management
Department of Leisure, Recreation and Tourism Management
 International School
Department of Applied English
Department of Applied Japanese
International Bachelor Program in Tourism Management
International Bachelor Program in Chinese Culinary Arts

University Founding Principles 
 Promote holistic education to cultivate outstanding talents for the hospitality and tourism industries. 
 Integrate theory with practice to increase students’ competitiveness.
 Strengthen the cooperation between industry and academy to create a platform for hospitality research and development.
 Implement lifelong learning to improve the quality of hospitality and tourism employees.
 Develop international communication to promote a global outlook.

Institutional Positioning 
 Cultivate talented leaders for the hospitality industry
 Act as a key partner for business and industry
 Promote a new paradigm of hospitality education

Transportation
NKUHT is within 3 kilometers of Siaogang Station of the Kaohsiung MRT.

University structure 
The university also runs the Affiliated Hospitality Senior High School of National Kaohsiung University of Hospitality and Tourism，NKHHS, a daughter institution for secondary-school students in Taiwan.

See also
 List of universities in Taiwan

References

External links

 National Kaohsiung University of Hospitality and Tourism

Universities and colleges in Kaohsiung
1995 establishments in Taiwan
Hospitality schools
Educational institutions established in 1995
Universities and colleges in Taiwan
Technical universities and colleges in Taiwan